Minicom is a text-based modem control and terminal emulator program for Unix-like operating systems, originally written by Miquel van Smoorenburg, and modeled somewhat after the popular MS-DOS program Telix but is open source. Minicom includes a dialing directory, ANSI and VT100 emulation, an (external) scripting language, and other features. Minicom is a menu-driven communications program. It also has an auto ZMODEM download. It now comes packaged in most major Linux distribution repositories such as Debian, Ubuntu and Arch Linux.

A common use for Minicom is when setting up a remote serial console, perhaps as a last resort to access a computer if the LAN is down. This can be done using nothing more than a 386 laptop with a Minicom floppy distribution such as Pitux or Serial Terminal Linux.

Minicom is useful to create console for devices having no display such as switches, routers or server blade enclosure. It is also useful for data logging output from serial devices such as Arduino Uno. Minicom has some beneficial features that are not available in all terminal based serial communication programs such as adding operating system timestamp to serial data.

See also 
 tip (Unix utility)
 PuTTy
 Tera Term
 List of Terminal Emulators

References

External links 
 minicom(1) – Linux User Commands Manual
 

Free communication software
Free software programmed in C
Free terminal emulators